The Zug massacre took place on 27 September 2001 in the city of Zug (Canton of Zug, Switzerland) in the canton's parliament. Friedrich Leibacher shot dead 14 people before killing himself. 

In the years before the massacre, Leibacher drew attention to himself by the intense use of lawsuits. These were dismissed, so he assumed he was being persecuted by the state and felt he had to resort to violence. Leibacher was armed with a civilian version of a Stgw 90 (Swiss Army assault rifle), a SIG Sauer pistol, a pump-action shotgun, and a revolver, and he wore a homemade police vest. Leibacher was able to enter the parliament building without problem.

Attack

Leibacher started shooting in the hall where the members of parliament were meeting. He killed three members of the Executive Council ("Regierungsräte") and eleven members of the legislature ("Kantonsräte"), and wounded 18 politicians and journalists, some heavily. He fired 91 rounds. He then ignited a homemade bomb and took his own life.  His main intended target was the Cantonal Minister Robert Bisig, who was unharmed. Leibacher left a suicide note titled "Tag des Zornes für die Zuger Mafia" ("Day of wrath for the Zug mafia"), which referred to his belief there was a plot against him.

Perpetrator

Leibacher had been working, and had several failed marriages to women from the Dominican Republic, with one of whom with he had a daughter. In 1970 he was convicted of incest, theft, forgery and traffic offences, and sentenced to 18 months' detention. He served his sentence in a work-training institution.

After leaving detention, Leibacher became unemployed. Doctors diagnosed him with paranoid personality disorder and alcoholism and he received an invalidity pension. In 1998 he was convicted of threatening a bus driver employed by the Zug transport company. Leibacher was upset by his treatment, and wrote frequently to the authorities with letters of complaint. The passage of time did not diminish his grievance as Leibacher began to believe he was the target of a government conspiracy led by Robert Bisig, a member of the cantonal government. He sued Bisig, but in September 2001 his action was dismissed by the court.

Aftermath 

Afterwards, many local parliaments increased their security or installed security measures.  Some established a strict access control for visitors and security passes for the politicians and staff.

On the national level, the Sektion Sicherheit Parlamentsgebäude (section for the security of parliament buildings) was established as part of the Bundessicherheitsdienst (Federal Security Service), a police unit of 35, which secures the Bundeshaus in Bern. As part of a general electronic access control for visitors, access controls with X-ray machines were installed. Further, separate wings of the Bundeshaus were secured with gates, which have to be opened with an access badge/card.

Many cantons and communities have compiled files of people who are considered Nörgler, Querulanten and Behördenhasser (nigglers, grumblers, haters of the administration), who have threatened people, filed lawsuits or bombard authorities with protest notes and who think they have been treated unfairly after the suits have been dismissed. Since the Zug massacre such people are watched closely. Mediation centres were founded in which the so-called Ombudsmänner try to mediate conflicts. Police stations became more sensitive to threats, with people making threats temporarily detained and their houses searched for weapons. When issuing weapon licenses, the application is closely examined, since Leibacher had been diagnosed with psychosis and "brain weakness" ("Gehirnschwäche"). He was legally able to buy the weapons although he had already threatened people, had been known as a querulous vexatious grumbler, and had had a report made against him.

Deaths 
 Peter Bossard, member of the Cantonal Government.
 Monika Hutter-Häfliger, member of the Cantonal Government.
 Jean-Paul Flachsmann, member of the Cantonal Government.
 Herbert Arnet, president of the Cantonal Parliament.
 Martin Döbeli, cantonal councilor.
 Dorly Heimgartner, cantonal councilor.
 Kurt Nussbaumer, cantonal councilor.
 Rolf Nussbaumer, cantonal councilor.
 Konrad Häusler, cantonal councilor.
 Erich Iten, cantonal councilor.
 Karl Gretener, cantonal councilor.
 Willi Wismer, cantonal councilor.
 Heinz Grüter, cantonal councilor.
 Käthi Langenegger, cantonal councilor.
 Friedrich Leibacher (Spree killer, Zug)

See also
Romanshorn shooting
List of attacks on legislatures
List of massacres in Switzerland

References

2001 in politics
Attacks on legislatures
Deaths by firearm in Switzerland
Improvised explosive device bombings in Europe
Mass murder in 2001
Mass murder in Switzerland
Mass shootings in Switzerland
Murder–suicides in Europe
People murdered in Switzerland
September 2001 crimes
September 2001 events in Europe
Spree shootings in Switzerland
Suicides by firearm in Switzerland
Zug
2001 murders in Switzerland
2001 mass shootings in Europe